The Joseph Battell Wilderness is one of eight wilderness areas in the Green Mountain National Forest in the U.S. state of Vermont. The wilderness area, created by the New England Wilderness Act of 2006, is named in honor of Joseph Battell (1839–1915), a philanthropist and environmentalist from Middlebury, Vermont. The wilderness consists of  managed by the U.S. Forest Service.

There are numerous mountains in the area with altitudes of at least , including (from south to north to east): the Great Cliffs, Mount Horrid, Cape Lookoff Mountain, Gillespie Peak, Romance Mountain, Worth Mountain, Monastery Mountain, and Philadelphia Peak. The core of the area, from Monastery Mountain to Worth Mountain to Romance Mountain, was bequeathed as a "park" to Middlebury College by Battell in 1915. Middlebury College sold nearly all of Battell's lands to the Forest Service in the 1930s and 1950s. It was the sale of these lands that prompted the Federal government to create the northern unit of the Green Mountain National Forest.

The Long Trail crosses the entire length of the Joseph Battell Wilderness from Brandon Gap on its south edge to Middlebury Gap on its north edge. The wilderness is traversed by several other hiking trails including the Sucker Brook Trail.

See also

 List of largest wilderness areas in the United States
 List of wilderness areas of the United States
 National Wilderness Preservation System
 Wilderness Act

References

Wilderness areas of Vermont
IUCN Category Ib
Protected areas of Addison County, Vermont
Green Mountain National Forest
Protected areas established in 2006
2006 establishments in Vermont